Oregon Observatory  is an astronomical observatory operated by the not-for-profit Sunriver Nature Center & Observatory in Sunriver, Oregon, United States, near Sunriver Resort.  As of 2011, the observatory had eleven telescopes, and by 2013, it had twenty-three telescopes with thirteen of them  or more. In July 2012, the observatory was renamed the Oregon Observatory at Sunriver.

See also 
List of astronomical observatories

References

Astronomical observatories in Oregon
Buildings and structures in Deschutes County, Oregon
Tourist attractions in Deschutes County, Oregon